Woodrow Landfair (born Stanley Wood Landfair II on November 9, 1982, also called "Pack") is an American novelist, and NCAA Champion athlete, known for pawning his 2005 College World Series ring, changing his name, and leaving on a used motorcycle to live as an itinerant laborer on what became a forty-eight state odyssey. The motorcycle trip is the subject of the novel Land Of The Free (2014).

Background
Landfair grew up with his mother and two sisters in Springfield, Virginia, and with his father in California - at first near Los Angeles, then in San Francisco. He enrolled at the University of Texas in 2001, on full academic scholarship from the United States Navy with the ambition to become a SEAL. Dared by fellow Midshipmen to show up at the baseball team's October 2002 walk-on tryout, Landfair earned a spot on the roster.

A member of the 2005 NCAA Division I Baseball Championship team, he won varsity letters in each of his three seasons, and was voted Teammate of the Year by his fellow players for both the 2004 and 2005 campaigns.

Between 2003 and 2005, he trained with future Major League Baseball players Huston Street, JP Howell, Drew Stubbs, Omar Quintanilla, Brad Halsey, Curtis Thigpen, Michael Hollimon, Matt Holliday, Alex Hinshaw, Chris Davis, Taylor Teagarden and Sam LeCure at the University of Texas.

After injuring his lower back running marathons, he tore two discs in his spine over the course of the 2005 season. No longer a student-athlete nor on scholarship from the Navy, he studied creative writing under Zulfikar Ghose. Setting out to research and write a novel, he sold everything he had—including his National Championship ring—and, with no previous riding experience, left on a recently purchased used motorcycle.

48 State Motorcycle Journey
Landfair first gained notoriety in 2006, amidst an indefinite nationwide odyssey. Pawning all he owned, he purchased a 1995 Suzuki Intruder 800 motorcycle he did not know how to ride, and left with "no route, no budget, no clue."

At first sleeping outside, he worked as a manual laborer, eventually crossing all forty-eight contiguous states. During his time on the road, he legally changed his name to Woodrow, stayed in two New York City homeless shelters, worked for cash with illegal immigrants, and spent over a month living within the Anarchist group Common Ground Collective in New Orleans's Lower Ninth Ward after Hurricane Katrina. Among other odd jobs, he worked as a day laborer, a swimming pool lifeguard, a bouncer, a truck driver, a door-to-door salesman, a beverage delivery man, a stagehand, and a waiter for an Italian restaurant with ownership ties to the Gambino crime family. Landfair used the jobs as material for oral stories. Between traveling and working, he began self-promoting in roadside bars and coffee shops where he talked about his hoboing experiences. He developed a storytelling act, eventually appearing in theaters and on regional and nationwide television.

As of May 2007, he had reached thirty-two states, performing oral stories in forty-one cities. He was featured in several newspapers nationwide and on May 8, 2007 appeared on the front page of the Austin American Statesman as part of a two-page spread. On September 23, 2007, Landfair authored and performed a one man show 48 States of Adventure at Washington D.C.'s Wolf Trap National Park for the Performing Arts in front of a capacity crowd. The show was recorded as an album, 48 LIVE, which sells on iTunes.  On September 24, 2007, the Fox News Channel ran a feature on Landfair, his stories and his travels. Anchor Shepard Smith referred to Landfair as aspiring to become "the next John Steinbeck or Louis L'Amour."

From 2007-2008, he published articles as associate editor of Prop. 65 Clearinghouse in San Francisco, then joined the production staff at New York City's The Public Theater in 2009. With approval from the US State Department, Landfair left New York in 2010 to join an American delegation in Havana, Cuba.

According to IMDb, Landfair appears in the Richard Linklater documentary Inning by Inning: A Portrait of a Coach, which aired on ESPN in 2008 and was filmed during the 2006 college baseball season in which coach Augie Garrido attempted to capture consecutive national titles. Landfair is also listed on the credits of Benjamin Moses Smith's short film David and the Fish.

Land Of The Free
In June 2014, Landfair's semi-autobiographical novel Land of the Free was published by Harbinger Book Group with the support of a twenty-eight city book tour, which retraced parts of Landfair's motorcycle travels.

The novel met mixed reviews, with Kirkus Reviews writing, “Throughout, Landfair’s evocative prose places the reader on the seemingly endless highways and byways of our expansive country. However, for all of its focus on trying to understand the American spirit, the novel fails to divulge very much information about its main character.”

References 

 Golden, Cedric.  (2007-05-08), "A Free Spirit and Ex-Horn Rides On", Austin American Statesman  (long article)
 Loza, Josefina.  (2007-06-14), "Writer on cross-country trip to share stories in Omaha", Omaha World-Herald 
 Schafer, Alyssa.  (2007-06-03), "Touring the 'Land of Opportunity'", Bismarck Tribune 
 Dukes, Lucy. (2007-05-09), "Writer Speaking on Motorcycle Travels, Author Taking Trip To Be Fiction Book Guy", Coeur d'Alene Press (Feature on Landfair and his visit to Coeur d'Alene)
 Healy, Amber. (2007-04-05), "Modern-Day Troubadour", Springfield Connection 
 Harris, Katie.  (2007-04-06), "Motorcyclist Travels Nation, Plans to Give Away $3,000", Daily Toreador  (Article in Texas Tech University newspaper)
 Pinkman, John. (2004–06), "After Injury Texas Player Moves On", Collegiate Baseball
 Word Press 
 Reno Gazette-Journal 
 University of Texas sports site article partly on Landfair 
 Holcomb, Lori.  (2007-07-12), "Friend Comes to B.C. during His Search for the 'Pulse of America'", Battle Creek Enquirer 
 Farrell, Joelle.  (2007-07-23), "5 Questions for Cross-Country Motorcyclist", Concord Monitor 
 Tice, Lindsay.  (2007-07-25), "Trek on Two Wheels", Sun Journal 
 McNiff, Tim.  (2007-07-05), "Travelin' Man", NBC Minneapolis KARE-11  (Television Interview)
 Henley, Bill. (2007-08-10), "Woodrow Landfair", 10! Show, NBC Philadelphia
 MATT & HUGGY.  (2007-08-10), "Author Once Lived in Homeless Shelter", WYSP Philadelphia, Infinity/CBS/XM Satellite
 Allen, Betty Archer. (2007-08-02), "Landfair Completes Cross Country Journey", Gulf Breeze News
 Healy, Amber.  (2007-09-13), "Long and Winding Road Home", Springfield Connection
 Smith, Shepherd.  (2007-09-24), "Author Travels America", Fox News Channel
 Hayward, JC. (2007-11-09), "Woodrow 'Pack' Landfair", CBS Washington, D.C.
 nbcnews.com. (2009-04-13), "What's The Secret To An Endless Vacation?" 
 Denver Post. (2009-05-31), "Permanent Tourists See, Show The World", 
 Elliot, Christopher. (2009-05-24), "The Latest Trend? Becoming a Nomad", San Francisco Chronicle 
 Richmond Times Dispatch. (2014-06-13), "Book Notes", 
 Wilkinson, Bud. (2014-03-19), "Landfair Uses Journey As Basis For Novel", Ride-CT.com 
 The Alcalde, (2014-4-29), "May|June Alumni Authors" 
 Duncan, S. Preston. (2014-05-29), "Woodrow Landfair's Land Of The Free Blends Truth And Fiction Into Cinematic American Travelogue", RVA Magazine 
 Valeri, John. (2014-6-20), "Motorcycle Diaries: Woodrow Landfair on Land Of The Free", Hartford Books Examiner 
 Noll, Jessica. (2014-6-09), "American Storyteller Woodrow Landfair Documents His Adventure On The Road", CBS Richmond, VA

External links
 The Across America Website  (Chronicles Landfair's adventures)
 LAND OF THE FREE Book Tour Webpage 
 2005 National Champion Roster 
 The Baseball Cube  (page on Landfair's baseball career, but with no stats or information provided)
 Texas State Legislature Bill  about the Baseball team, including him on a list.
 Landfair's connection to Huston Street and Omar Quintanilla 

Living people
1982 births
21st-century American novelists
American male novelists
American storytellers
Long-distance motorcycle riders
Sportspeople from Fairfax County, Virginia
Writers from Austin, Texas
Texas Longhorns baseball players
University of Texas at Austin alumni
21st-century American male writers
Novelists from Texas